Olga Zuiderhoek (born September 16, 1946 in Assen) is a Dutch actress. She graduated in 1970 from the  Amsterdam Theater School. After having been associated with the cooperative association  Het Werkteater for many years, she worked for the theater companies De Mexican Hond and Orkater and played mainly in new plays by homegrown, sometimes written for her.

Theater 

Zuiderhoek was a member of the innovative theater group Het Werkteater from 1974 to 1982. After that she played with theater group Orkater in the plays  Parking  (1987) and  Een goed hoofd  (1991) and further with De Mexican Hond in the play  Kaatje drowned  (1993). In her later acting career she worked, among others, with the Dutch writers Kees van Kooten, Adriaan van Dis, Jan Donkers, Paul Haenen and Frank Houtappels, who sometimes also wrote a piece for her. In Theater Bellevue, Zuiderhoek has been playing the Christmas performance  Peace on nature  together with Kees Prins for years. In 1986 Olga won 'the golden heart of Rotterdam' with Danny and Roberta and in 2007 'the Audience Award' for the performance  Who is afraid of Virginia Woolf  directed by Gerardjan Rijnders.
In 2014 and 2015 she played Queen Wilhelmina in  the musical “Soldaat van Oranje”.

Awards and nominations 
 In 1986 she was nominated for a  Gouden Kalf for her role as mother Duif, in  Abel  by Alex van Warmerdam .
 In 1986 she won 'Het Gouden Hart van Rotterdam' theater prize for her role as Roberta in the play  Danny en Roberta .
 In 1995 she was nominated for her role as Tine Tak in the television series  The lonely war of Koos Tak  by director  Theo van Gogh.
 In 2007 the play  Who's afraid of Virginia Woolf?  Directed by Gerardjan Rijnders with Olga Zuiderhoek and Porgy Franssen won the Theater Audience Award.
 In 2012 Zuiderhoek won a Golden Calf in the category "best supporting actress" for her role in "Süskind".
 In 2014 she won at De TV-Beelden in the category "best supporting actor (m / f)" for her role in "Penoza III".

Personal life 
Zuiderhoek lives in Amsterdam and was together for 28 years with jazz musician Willem Breuker, who died in 2010.

Filmography 
  Turkish Delight  (1973)
  Naked Over the Fence  (1973)
  Camping  (1978)
  Recording  (1979)
  High Heels, Real Love  (1981)
  Rigor Mortis  (1981)
  The Taste of Water  (1982)
  A Balmy Summer Evening  (1982)
 And / Or (1985)
  Abel  (1986)
  Speaking of Luck  (1987)
  Theo and Thea and the Unmasking of the Wicker Cheese Empire  (1989)
 Tropical Years (1989)
  A Strange Love  (1990)
  The Northerners  (1992)
  The Johnsons 1992
  Movie!  (1995)
  The Dress  (1996)
  Minoes  (2001)
  Yes Sister, No Sister  (2002)
  HannaHannah  (2007)
  Tiramisu  (2008)
  Strong Stories  (2010)
  Furious  (2011)
  Süskind  (2011)
  After the Tone  (2013)
  Penoza: The Final Chapter  (2019)
  April, May and June  (2019)

Television series 
 Open & Naked (1974)
  For better or worse  (1991–1998)
  We're back home  (1990–1994)
  Seth & Fiona  (1994)
  The Lonely War of Koos Tak  (1995)
  Baantjer (2000)
  Au  (1997)
  Loenatik  (1998)
  Otje  (1998)
  Meiden van De Wit  (2003)
  Keyzer & De Boer Lawyers  (2005)
  Evelien  (2006)
  Song of Life  (2011)
  Penoza  (2010–2017) -
  The man with the hammer  (2013)
  Lord & Master  (2014)
  Trollie  (2015) - Mimi
  Oldenheim's 12  (2017) 
  The secret diary of Hendrik Groen  (2017)

Documentary and book 
In 2012, two years after the death of her husband Willem Breuker, the documentary Het Nieuwe Huis van Olga Zuiderhoek was made. In 2014 she wrote with journalist Ingrid Harms the cookbook  Ongezouten Zuiderhoek  about cooking without salt. Zuiderhoek gained experience with this because Breuker was prescribed a low salt diet. The book contains illustrations by Peter van Straaten.

External links 
 Short biographical sketch on werkater.nl

References 

Living people
Dutch actresses
1946 births
People from Assen